

The Baldwin Hills are a low mountain range surrounded by and rising above the Los Angeles Basin plain in central Los Angeles County, California.  The Pacific Ocean is to the west, the Santa Monica Mountains to the north, Downtown Los Angeles to the northeast, and the Palos Verdes Hills to the south - with all easily viewed from the Baldwin Hills.

Geography
The headwaters of the urban river known as Ballona Creek are in the Santa Monica Mountains, such as above Beverly Hills and flows along the north base of Baldwin Hills through an active geological watergap, on the way to the Pacific Ocean in Santa Monica Bay. La Cienega Boulevard goes through a pass in the ridge of the Baldwin Hills between Inglewood and Culver City, and northeast of Los Angeles International Airport. La Cienega Boulevard is a parkway road passing alongside open space of large private corporate lands with oil wells of the Inglewood Oil Field in the southern Baldwin Hills.

History
 Rancho La Cienega o Paso de la Tijera—eastern area
 Sanchez Adobe de Rancho La Cienega o Paso de la Tijera.  The adobe was once the center of the rancho. In the 1920s, an addition was built linking the structures and the building was converted into a larger clubhouse for the Sunset Golf Course.
 Rancho Rincon de los Bueyes—western area
 The hills are the location of the Baldwin Hills Dam failure and subsequent 1963 Baldwin Hills Reservoir flooding disaster.

Recreation

 Kenneth Hahn State Recreation Area: recreation, such as walking, picnicking, and bird-watching fits in with preservation of the open-space lands and native habitats: entrance on South La Cienega Boulevard.
 official Baldwin Hills Scenic Overlook Park website - entrance on Jefferson Boulevard; trail map
 Norman O Houston Park website
 Jim Gilliam Recreation Center website
 Park to Playa Trail
 Stocker Corridor
 Kenneth Hahn State Recreation Area
 Blair Hills – Segment C
 Baldwin Hills Scenic Overlook
 Culver City Park
 Ballona Creek Bike Path
 Stoneview Nature Center
 Norman O. Houston Park
 Reuben Ingold Park

See also
 Baldwin Hills
 Blair Hills, Culver City
 Culver Crest
 Fox Hills, Culver City
 Inglewood Oil Field
 Ladera Heights
 Leimert Park
 Ranchos of California
 View Park-Windsor Hills
 Village Green
 West Los Angeles College

References

External links 
 Official Kenneth Hahn State Recreation Area website
 The Baldwin Hills Conservancy
 Baldwin Hills dam history

 
Baldwin Hills, Los Angeles
Crenshaw, Los Angeles
Culver City, California
Geography of Los Angeles
Hills of California
Mountain ranges of Los Angeles County, California
Mountain ranges of Southern California
Parks in Los Angeles County, California
South Los Angeles
Transverse Ranges
Westside (Los Angeles County)
Tourist attractions in Inglewood, California